Ann Morgan may refer to:

Ann Morgan Guilbert, actress
Ann Haven Morgan, zoologist

See also
Anne Morgan (disambiguation)
Anna Morgan (disambiguation)